Union University is a private Baptist Christian university in Jackson, Tennessee, with additional campuses in Germantown and Hendersonville. The university is affiliated with the Tennessee Baptist Convention (Southern Baptist Convention). It is a union of several different schools: West Tennessee College, formerly known as Jackson Male Academy; Union University of Murfreesboro; Southwestern Baptist University; and Hall-Moody Junior College of Martin, Tennessee.

History

Early history

Jackson Male Academy was founded in 1823 just after West Tennessee was opened for settlement.  Only five years earlier in 1818 was the land purchased from the Chickasaw Indians.

Union University was established in 1875 in a consolidation of Southwestern Baptist College at Murfreesboro and West Tennessee College at Jackson.

In 1907, Dr. T.T. Eaton, a trustee of Southwestern Baptist University, left his 6,000 volume library to the college. Eaton was a former professor of Union University at Murfreesboro, where his father, Dr. Joseph H. Eaton, was a former president. Later that year Southwestern changed its name to Union University to honor the Eatons and others from Union at Murfreesboro who had impacted Southwestern as faculty, administrators, trustees, and contributors.

In 1925 the Tennessee Baptist Convention secured a charter that vested the rights, authority, and property of Union University in the Tennessee Convention.  This charter included the election of the university's trustees. Two years later, the Convention consolidated Hall-Moody Junior College at Martin (1900–1927) with Union University; the former Hall-Moody campus subsequently became the location of the University of Tennessee Junior College, now the University of Tennessee at Martin.

In 1948 the Southern Association of Colleges and Schools granted Union University accreditation.

In 1962 Union developed a nursing program with the assistance of Jackson-Madison County General Hospital at the request of local physicians.

In 1975 Union moved from downtown Jackson, Tennessee, to a new campus located near the Highway 45-Bypass in north Jackson.

The Craig and Barefoot Administrations
During President Robert Craig (1967–85) and President Hyran Barefoot's (1987–1996) administrations:
enrollment increased from fewer than 1,000 students to more than 2,000;
the Penick Academic Complex was enlarged several times;
additional housing units were erected;
and the Blasingame Academic Complex (1986) and the Hyran E. Barefoot Student Union Building (1994) were constructed.

From the early 1950s to the early 1970s, Union operated an Extension Center in the Memphis area. From 1987 to 1995, Union offered the degree-completion program leading to the Bachelor of Science in Nursing (RN to BSN track) in Memphis. At that time there were over 300 graduates of this program.

David S. Dockery's Administration

David S. Dockery was elected as the fifteenth president of Union University in December 1995. Dockery brought a desire to take Union to a more rigorous, conservative path. During his administration, which lasted until 2014, he realized:
headcount increase from 2200 (in 1996) to more than 5300 (in 2012);
increased giving to Union, including ten of the largest commitments in Union history;
changed the school's logo and marketing fonts;
construction of two residence halls, Miller Tower, Jennings Hall, Hammons Hall, Fesmire Field House and the new White Hall science building;
successful completion of the $60 million comprehensive "Building a Future" campaign (1998–2005) (now at $69 million);
renewed commitment to scholarship and research among Union faculty-part of Union's new Center for Faculty Development;
new undergraduate majors in political science, physics, theology, digital media studies, church history, ethics, sports management, sports medicine, engineering; and graduate programs in education (M.Ed., Ed.S., and Ed.D.), nursing (MSN with tracks in education, administration, and nurse anesthesia), and intercultural studies (MAIS);
SACS Level V accreditation was achieved;
the establishment of an extension campus in Germantown, Tennessee, which now has almost 700 students;
the establishment of the Carl F.H. Henry Center for Christian Leadership;
the establishment of the Charles Colson Chair for Faith and Culture;
the establishment of the annual Scholarship Banquet (1997–2004);
the renaming of a road to his honor his wife (Lanese Dockery Drive);
achieving top tier recognition in U.S. News & World Report and other important listings.
Implemented the $110 million "Union 2010" plan that includes the future addition of new tennis courts, new intramural fields, and an amphitheatre, which has already included the completion of a second soccer field, the Fesmire Fieldhouse, and the state-of-the-art science building, White Hall.
 a Doctor of Pharmacy program.

2008 tornado

The tornado destroyed 18 dormitory buildings and caused over $40 million worth of damage to the campus, which suffered a direct hit, rendering almost 80% of the dormitory space to be either totally destroyed or unlivable. None of the approximately 1,800 students on campus at the time were killed. David Dockery, the president of the university, said:

I'm convinced-nobody will ever convince me otherwise-that God's angels were unleashed to come as ministering spirits to protect those students in the most precarious of situations.

Fifty-one students were taken to Jackson-Madison General Hospital.  While most students were released after being treated, nine were kept overnight.  Some students were trapped for hours while emergency crews worked to rescue them. A total of 31 buildings received damage of varying degrees. The devastation captured nationwide attention and was featured by CNN, Fox News, The New York Times and numerous regional news outlets. Secretary of Homeland Security Michael Chertoff, FEMA Director R. David Paulison and Governor of Tennessee Phil Bredesen all visited the campus after the disaster.

The Commercial Appeal reported that due to extensive damage, the campus would not reopen until February 18. Lambuth University, a rival area university, reportedly offered to open its dormitories to displaced Union students.  The congregation of Englewood Baptist Church, which owned the Old English Inn in Jackson, voted unanimously to open the inn to Union students.  The church's move accommodated almost 300 students until December 2008.  The university also expected that around 200 students would be housed in the private homes of Union faculty, staff and friends.

The February 5, 2008 event was the second time in just over five years that the campus was hit by a tornado. On the evening of November 10, 2002, during the Veterans Day Weekend tornado outbreak, the university was struck by an F1 tornado, with winds of approximately 100 miles per hour, which did approximately 2 million dollars worth of damage to the university.  There were no serious injuries. Union president David Dockery stated that the February 5, 2008 tornado was about 15 times as bad at the 2002 tornado.  The damage caused by the February 5th tornado was estimated at $40 million.

Samuel W. "Dub" Oliver's administration 
Samuel W. "Dub" Oliver became Union University's sixteenth president in June 2014. He previously worked at Baylor University and was president at East Texas Baptist University for five years.

Thus far in his presidency, he has achieved:
 the start of a new greenhouse project in July 2014;
 the completion of The Logos — Union's three-story, 54,000-square foot library started in July 2014 and dedicated on November 6, 2015;
 the adoption of a new strategic plan for 2016-2020 by the board of trustees in the fall of 2015.

Presidents

Academics
Union University is accredited by the Southern Association of Colleges and Schools (SACS). On July 14, 2013, Union University announced that its Business Program had earned accreditation from The Association to Advance Collegiate Schools of Business (AACSB).

Union University has been a member of the Council for Christian Colleges and Universities (CCCU). In August 2015, Union notified CCCU that the university would be withdrawing its membership as a result of the CCCU's allowing member schools to hire individuals in a same-sex relationship.

Rankings

For 2015, U.S. News ranked Union 14th among "Regional Universities" in the South. It has been recognized by Peterson's Competitive College Guide, the Time/Princeton Review, and Templeton's Colleges that Encourage Character Development. Union is a recipient of the President's Higher Education Community Service Award and has been listed as one of America's Top 100 College Buys.  In addition, U.S. News has cited Union as an "A+ option for serious B students," among "Up and Coming Schools" and among schools "where the faculty has an unusually strong commitment to undergraduate teaching."

Union is also recognized in:
Peterson's Guide to Competitive Colleges;
The Templeton Foundation Guide for Colleges That Encourage Character Development;
America's Best College Buys;
Kiplinger's Best College Values and
America's Best College Scholarships.

Campus

Jackson facilities

Germantown facilities
Union also has a  campus in Germantown, Tennessee, (suburban Memphis) offering graduate degrees in business, education, Christian studies & nursing. The degrees in education include the M.Ed., M.A.Ed., Ed.S., and Ed.D.

Hendersonville facilities
Union's newest location is in Hendersonville, Tennessee, a suburb of Nashville. This campus offers graduate degrees in education and Christian studies.

Housing
In Jackson, Union has apartment-style living.  Each student has a separate private bedroom that shares a common living space with three roommates. All apartments feature a high-speed Internet connection, as well as kitchen unit. Some apartments feature private phone lines or a washer and dryer. All private living spaces have a window and the common areas have cable TV access.  There is no student housing at the Germantown campus. Temporary off campus housing was at The Jett (the former Old English Inn) for the majority of the spring 2008 semester.

Athletics

Union (Tenn.) athletic teams are the Bulldogs. The university is a member of the NCAA Division II level, primarily competing in the Gulf South Conference (GSC) since the 2012–13 academic year. They were also a member of the National Christian College Athletic Association (NCCAA), primarily competing as an independent in the Mid-East Region of the Division I level. The Bulldogs previously competed in the defunct TranSouth Athletic Conference (TranSouth or TSAC) of the National Association of Intercollegiate Athletics (NAIA) from 1996–97 to 2011–12. Union began the three-year transition to full NCAA Division II membership in 2011.

Union (Tenn.) competes in 11 intercollegiate varsity sports: Men's sports include baseball, basketball, cross country, golf and soccer; while women's sports include basketball, cross country, golf, soccer, softball and volleyball. Former sports included cheerleading.

Accomplishments
In the NAIA, Union captured five women's basketball national titles (1998, 2005, 2006, 2009, 2010). Union also has won national titles in the NCCAA in volleyball (2003), men's soccer (2004), softball (2001, 2002, 2004, 2013) and women's basketball (2014).

Greek system
There are six social fraternities and sororities on campus, two music fraternities and numerous academic fraternities.

Each of these groups is relatively large in size relative to the size of the institution and consistently contributes to philanthropies, both regionally and globally.  The number of members in the social fraternities can range between 20 and 80 members per chapter.

The fraternities and sororities are an active presence on campus through philanthropy, intramural sports and Greek Olympics.

Fraternities
The fraternities represented on campus are:

Sororities
The sororities represented on campus are:

Academic
The academic fraternities are:

Controversy
The school upholds a strict code of conduct regarding sex outside of marriage, homosexual acts, gender identity, pregnancy and abortion. In 2008, Union denied the Soulforce Equality Ride, a group advocating for the safe treatment of homosexual and transgender students, access to its campus.  In 2015, Union withdrew from the Council of Christian Colleges and Universities after two council colleges claimed that they were willing to hire faculty members in same sex marriages. .

Publications
The Cardinal and Cream is the campus newspaper
The Torch is the English Department's literary and arts publication

Guest lecture events

Annual Scholarship Banquet
Union's Scholarship Banquet has brought prominent national and international figures to Union including: former presidents George H. W. Bush and George W. Bush, former Secretary of State Condoleezza Rice, former Secretary of State Colin Powell, former Russian president and Nobel Prize winner Mikhail Gorbachev, former British Prime Minister Margaret Thatcher, former Senator Bob Dole, presidential candidate Rudy Giuliani, former British Prime Minister John Major, Tony Blair, and Winston S. Churchill, Grandson of the former British Prime Minister.

Union Forum
Union's Forum is an annual speaker series that has brought several national figures to Union, including Peggy Wehmeyer, William Kristol, Michael Medved, Robert Novak, Stephen Carter, Morton Kondracke, Clarence Page, Juan Williams, and Margaret Carlson.

Notable people

Alumni

 Bob Agee, executive director for the International Association of Baptist Colleges and Universities, and President Emeritus, Oklahoma Baptist University.
Milton Brown (politician) (W) - U.S. Representative and co-founder of Southwestern University (now Union University) and Lambuth University both located in Jackson, Tennessee.

Joshua F. Drake - Musicologist and hymnist at Grove City College in Grove City, Pennsylvania.
Steve Gaines - Pastor of Bellevue Baptist Church in Memphis, Tennessee. President of the Southern Baptist Convention.
Pauline LaFon Gore - mother of United States Vice President Albert Gore, attended Union and was awarded an honorary degree.
J. D. Grey (Bachelor's degree, 1929), Southern Baptist pastor and convention president from 1952 to 1954
George H. Guthrie - Professor of New Testament, Regent College; former Benjamin W. Perry Professor of Bible and chair of the School of Christian Studies, Union University; one of the English Standard Version (ESV) Bible Translation Review Scholars. An expert in Greek Exegesis and writer known for his analysis and expertise on the Epistle to the Hebrews.
Eli Shelby Hammond - federal judge
John L. Head  (attended)- basketball coach
John W. Holland - federal judge
Howell Edmunds Jackson - United States Supreme Court Justice
William Hicks Jackson - Confederate general, brother of Justice Howell Edmonds Jackson
Jim Jones - American football player

Chad McMahan, Mississippi state senator.
Charles N. Millican - founding President for the University of Central Florida.
Gaylon Moore - professional basketball player
Jimmy Moore (baseball) - Major League baseball player

Tom J. Murray (D) - U.S. Representative from Tennessee from 1943 to 1966
David Alexander Nunn - U.S. Representative and Tennessee Secretary of State
Luis Ortiz (baseball) - Major League baseball player
Josephine Owino - basketball player for the Washington Mystics
Joseph B. Palmer - Confederate general and lawyer
Herron C. Pearson (D) - U.S. Representative from Tennessee
Jeanette Brooks Priebe - Director of the Louisville Civil Service Board in Kentucky
Chris Rice - Christian recording artist
Eugene Rice - United States federal judge (Eastern District of Oklahoma)
R. R. Sneed - Tennessee Secretary of State from 1913 to 1917
Scratch Track - Indie Acoustic Hip-hop Band
L. Thomas Strong III - Dean of Leavell College and Professor of New Testament and Greek in Leavell College at the New Orleans Baptist Theological Seminary.
John May Taylor (D) - U.S. Representative from Tennessee.
William E. Troutt - President, Rhodes College
Timothy Tucker - Former President of the American Pharmacists Association (APhA).  Former president of the Tennessee Pharmacists Association (TPA), president of the Tennessee Board of Pharmacy, and Speaker of the House for TPA for more than 10 years.  Winner of the Lambda Chi Alpha Order or Merit.
Jacob Mathis - World-renowned Logistics expert

Faculty and administration

Benjamin Lee Arnold - later became president of Oregon State University
James Robinson Graves - chair of the Board of Trustees, 1885–1892; minister, journalist, author, and co-founder of Landmark Baptism
Ed Bryant (R) - Tennessee politician
Stephen Carls - chair of the History Department and expert 20th-Century France, World War I, Europe between the two world wars, and French arms manufacturer Louis Loucheur.
George H. Guthrie - expert on the Epistle to the Hebrews
Harry Lee Poe - Charles Colson Chair of Faith and Culture
Ivy Scarborough - author and lawyer
C. Pat Taylor - president of Southwest Baptist University.

References

External links

 
 Official athletics website
 Union University Yearbooks: 1904-2000

 
Private universities and colleges in Tennessee
Jackson, Tennessee
Universities and colleges in the Memphis Metro Area
Universities and colleges affiliated with the Southern Baptist Convention
Baptist Christianity in Tennessee
Universities and colleges accredited by the Southern Association of Colleges and Schools
Education in Madison County, Tennessee
Education in Shelby County, Tennessee
Education in Sumner County, Tennessee
Educational institutions established in 1823
1823 establishments in Tennessee